Andromeda liberata is a pasticcio-serenata of 18 September 1726, on the subject of Perseus Freeing Andromeda, made as a collective tribute to the visiting Cardinal Pietro Ottoboni by at least five composers working in Venice including Vivaldi. It contains the last documented solo performance by Vivaldi as a violinist, performing the virtuoso violin part in his own aria "Sovente il sole". The work was re-assembled by Michael Talbot and recorded by Andrea Marcon with Simone Kermes, Anna Bonitatibus and Max Emanuel Cenčić  and the Venice Baroque Orchestra for Archiv in 2005.

References

1726 operas
Operas by Antonio Vivaldi